City Square was a rapid transit station in Charlestown, Massachusetts. It served the Charlestown Elevated, part of the MBTA's Orange Line, from 1901 until 1975. It was closed when the line was rerouted into a tunnel that was constructed as part of the Haymarket North Extension project. The closest replacement station to the location is now Community College.

References

External links

Charlestown, Boston
Railway stations in Boston
Orange Line (MBTA) stations
Former MBTA stations in Massachusetts